The 2009–10 Northwestern Wildcats men's basketball team represented Northwestern University in the 2009–10 college basketball season. This was head coach Bill Carmody's tenth season at the Northwestern. The Wildcats were members of the Big Ten Conference and played their home games at Welsh-Ryan Arena. They finished the season 20–14, 7–11 in Big Ten play, lost in the quarterfinals of the 2010 Big Ten Conference men's basketball tournament and were invited to the 2010 National Invitation Tournament where they lost in the first round to the University of Rhode Island. Northwestern received its first national (AP) ranking in 41 years, when it was ranked #25 in the December 28 AP poll.

Roster

Source:

"*"=indicates player used redshirt season.

Schedule and results
Source
All times are Central

|-
!colspan=8| Regular Season

|-
!colspan=8| 2010 Big Ten Conference men's basketball tournament

|-
!colspan=8| 2010 National Invitation Tournament

References

Northwestern Wildcats
Northwestern
Northwestern Wildcats men's basketball seasons
Northwestern Wild
Northwestern Wild